Juan Enrique 'Quique' Estebaranz López (born 6 October 1965) is a Spanish retired footballer who played as a forward.

He made almost 300 professional appearances during his professional career, during which he represented eight clubs. This notably included a La Liga spell with Tenerife.

Estebaranz was a Spanish international in the early 1990s.

Club career
Born in Madrid, Estebaranz started his football career with Atlético Madrid, although he only played for the reserve team. In the 1988–89 season he made his professional debut and scored 23 goals for Racing de Santander, although the Cantabrians were not ultimately promoted from Segunda División.

Afterwards, Estebaranz signed with CD Tenerife in La Liga, and he scored ten goals from 33 games in his first year, his career-best in the top division. However, the Canary Islands club finished in 18th position, only avoiding relegation by victory in the playoffs; he also played a part in Tenerife's denying of two league titles to Real Madrid in the last round, for the direct benefit of FC Barcelona, including in the 1992–93 campaign where he scored.

Estebaranz transferred to Barcelona for 1993–94, appearing rarely as the Catalans won their fourth league title in a row. The side also reached the final of the UEFA Champions League, with the player featuring the last 20 minutes of the 4–0 loss against A.C. Milan.

Estebaranz signed for Sevilla FC after only one season with Barcelona, but appeared very little in his two-year spell in Andalusia. He subsequently became an important top-flight player with CF Extremadura– who had just been promoted for the first time in its history to the competition – but suffered relegation, with the player scoring one goal, against CD Logroñés on 6 April 1997; he closed out his career at nearly 35, after spells with CD Ourense in the second division and amateurs Gimnástica Segoviana CF.

In 2001, Estebaranz returned to his first club Atlético Madrid, being charged with running its youth teams. Four years later he had his first head coaching experience, with another club from the Community of Madrid, lowly CD Leganés, being in charge for six months. The following year he re-joined the Colchoneros, after being named director of their football academy.

International career
Estebaranz played on three occasions for Spain, all in 1993. His debut came on 2 June against Lithuania, and his last cap came on 22 September against Albania, both matches for the 1994 FIFA World Cup qualification stages (2–0 and 5–1 away wins).

Estebaranz's second appearance was a friendly with Chile on 8 September, as he played the second half of the 2–0 victory in Alicante.

Honours
Barcelona
La Liga: 1993–94
UEFA Champions League runner-up: 1993–94

Individual
Segunda División Pichichi Trophy: 1988–89

References

External links

1965 births
Living people
Spanish footballers
Footballers from Madrid
Association football forwards
La Liga players
Segunda División players
Segunda División B players
Atlético Madrid B players
Racing de Santander players
CD Tenerife players
FC Barcelona players
Sevilla FC players
CF Extremadura footballers
CD Ourense footballers
Spain international footballers
Spanish football managers
Segunda División B managers
CD Leganés managers